Tony Armstrong may refer to:

 Tony Armstrong (Australian rules footballer) (born 1989), and ABC-TV personality
 Tony Armstrong (rugby league) (born 1958), rugby league footballer of the 1980s

See also
 Anthony Armstrong (disambiguation)